Dean Peter Spink (born 22 January 1967) is an English former professional footballer who played either as a striker or a defender. After retiring as a player, he became a physiotherapist for Shrewsbury Town but is now one at Solihull Moors. He is currently the reserve manager at Alvechurch FC.

Personal life
Since retiring Spink has ventured into nursery care and gym training, and returned to Shrewsbury initially as youth-team physiotherapist before getting promoted to first-team physio.

Honours
Individual
 PFA Team of the Year: 1993–94 Third Division
 Voted Shrewsbury Town F.C.'s "all-time cult hero" by viewers of the BBC show Football Focus in :2004.

References

External links

1967 births
Living people
Footballers from Birmingham, West Midlands
Association football forwards
Association football defenders
English footballers
Halesowen Town F.C. players
Aston Villa F.C. players
Scarborough F.C. players
Bury F.C. players
Shrewsbury Town F.C. players
Wrexham A.F.C. players
Chester City F.C. players
Telford United F.C. players
Kidsgrove Athletic F.C. players
Colwyn Bay F.C. players
English Football League players
National League (English football) players
English football managers
Chester City F.C. managers
Association football physiotherapists